was a mathematician who received his Ph.D. from University of Tokyo in 1960.

In 1963–1964, he introduced Kuga fiber varieties in a book published by the University of Chicago Press. In the summer of 1965 he gave a talk on Kuga fiber varieties at the American Mathematical Society's Symposium in Pure Mathematics held at the University of Colorado Boulder. In 2019 Beijing's Higher Education Press published a reprint of Kuga's 1964 book.

One of his books, Galois' Dream: Group Theory and Differential Equations, is a series of lectures on group theory and differential equations for undergraduate students, considering such topics as covering spaces and Fuchsian differential equations from the point of view of Galois theory, though it does not treat classical Galois theory of polynomials and fields in depth.

References

Notes

Bibliography
Kuga, Michio. Galois' Dream: Group Theory and Differential Equations. translated by Susan Addington and Motohico Mulase, 1993. Birkhäuser Boston, 

20th-century Japanese mathematicians
University of Tokyo alumni
Stony Brook University faculty
1990 deaths
1928 births